The Mediumwave transmitter Lopik was a medium wave broadcasting facility near Lopik in the Netherlands. It was constructed in 1938 and closed down on 1 September 2015. Its last use was to transmit the Dutch language edition of Radio Maria on 675 kHz. The aerial consisted of a 196-metre guyed steel framework mast, which was insulated against ground.

On 24 July 2015, Radio Maria Netherlands announced the closedown of its transmissions on 675 kHz Medium wave as of 1 September 2015.

Originally, there was also a second, 165 metre guyed steel framework mast for the mediumwave frequency 1332 kHz, but this was taken down on 21 August 2004.

On 4 September 2015, the remaining 196 metre mast was also taken down, marking the end of 75 years  of Medium wave transmissions from the Lopik site.

This mast should not be confused with the Gerbrandy tower in the nearby town of IJsselstein, which is used for FM- and TV-broadcasting. The Gerbrandy Tower used to be in the municipality of Lopik as well before an administrative change, and is often referred to as the "Lopik tower".

See also
List of masts

References

External links
 Lopik on www.waniewski.de
 http://www.skyscraperpage.com/diagrams/?b30108
 http://www.skyscraperpage.com/diagrams/?b30110
 
 https://web.archive.org/web/20050301000032/http://www.xs4all.nl/~okznet/Other/nozema/index.htm (dead link)

Radio masts and towers in Europe
Communication towers in the Netherlands
Towers in Utrecht (province)
Lopik